David Bryan Smith (born 11 December 1950) is a former professional footballer, who played for Huddersfield Town, Stockport County, Halifax Town, Cambridge United, Hartlepool United and Gateshead.

References

1950 births
Living people
English footballers
Footballers from Sheffield
Association football forwards
English Football League players
Northern Premier League players
Huddersfield Town A.F.C. players
Stockport County F.C. players
Halifax Town A.F.C. players
Cambridge United F.C. players
Hartlepool United F.C. players
Gateshead F.C. players